Balfe is a surname. Notable people with the surname include:
Michael William Balfe (1808–1870), Irish composer

Brendan Balfe (born 1945), Irish radio personality
Caitriona Balfe (born 1979), Irish actress and fashion model
David Balfe (born 1958), English musician and record producer
Jimmy Balfe, Irish footballer
Lorne Balfe (born 1976), Scottish composer
Richard Balfe (born 1944), English politician
Rupert Balfe (1890–1915), Australian rules footballer
Shaun Balfe (born 1972), English racing car driver
Veronica Cooper (née Balfe) (1913-2000), American socialite and actress
Victoria Balfe (1837–1871), Franco-Irish singer, daughter of Michael William Balfe